Renato Agostinho de Oliveira Júnior or simply Juninho (born April 25, 1981 in Santa Rita do Passa Quatro), is a Brazilian central defender.

Honours
Ceará State League: 2007

References

External links
CBF
sambafoot
furacao
gazeta

1981 births
Living people
People from Santa Rita do Passa Quatro
Brazilian footballers
Guarani FC players
Club Athletico Paranaense players
Ceará Sporting Club players
Fortaleza Esporte Clube players
Salgueiro Atlético Clube players
Association football defenders
Footballers from São Paulo (state)